Christian Liger (24 August 1935 – 3 December 2002) was a 20th-century French writer.

Biography 
Christian Liger studied in Nîmes then at the University of Montpellier. He earned his doctorate in letters with a thesis entitled Les débuts d’André Suarès.

After he was active as a teacher then University professor, he devoted himself entirely to writing: novels, essays, theater.

His last work, Le Roman de Rossel (fictionalized biography of the officer Minister for War of the Paris Commune, Louis-Nathaniel Rossel), was awarded:
 The Grand Prix du Livre d'Histoire de la Société des Gens de Lettres 1998
 The bourse Goncourt de la Biographie 1998, unanimously bestowed on Saturday 26 September in Nancy.
 The prix Michel Dard 1999.

Theatre 
Author
1963: Le Sorcier, directed by Marie-Claire Valène at Théâtre du Tertre in Paris
1969: La Tour d'Einstein, directed by Pierre Fresnay and Julien Bertheau

Adaptator
1975: Jésus II, after Joseph Delteil, directed by Jacques Échantillon,

Works 
 1963: Les Noces de Psyché, Éditions Gallimard
 1984: Histoire d'une famille nîmoise, les Paulhan, Cahiers Jean Paulhan, Gallimard.
 1987: Nîmes sans visa : portrait d'une ville, Ramsay.
 1992: Trois jours de chasse en montagne, Ed. Robert Laffont.
 1996: Les Marches du Palais, Ed. Robert Laffont.
 1998: Le Roman de Rossel, Ed. Robert Laffont.
 1999: La Nuit de Faraman, Ed. Robert Laffont.
 2001: Il se mit à courir le long du rivage, Ed. Robert Laffont.
 2010: Nouvelles de l'exil, Atelier baie.

Bibliography

References

External links 
  Les Archives du Spectacle
 Christian LIGER on Robert Laffont 
 Christian Liger à Nîmes on Éditions Alexandrine

20th-century French non-fiction writers
Prix Goncourt de la Biographie winners
1935 births
People from Nîmes
2002 deaths